Wanderson Ferreira de Oliveira (born 4 October 1994), commonly known as Valdívia, is a Brazilian footballer who plays as an attacking midfielder for Jeonnam Dragons.

Club career
Born in Jaciara, Mato Grosso, Valdívia played futsal until the age of 12. He subsequently moved to Rondonópolis and joined Rondonópolis Esporte Clube's youth setup.

Internacional

On 15 March 2012, after being the year's Copa São Paulo de Futebol Júnior top goalscorer, Valdívia was signed by Internacional. Initially with the under-20s, he made his Série A debut on 6 October 2013, coming on as a second-half substitute for fellow youth graduate Otávio in a 1–0 home win against Fluminense.

After appearing rarely in 2014 Campeonato Gaúcho, Valdívia was an important unit for the club during the year's Brasileirão, but being used mainly as a substitute; in July, already definitely promoted, he signed a new contract until 2018. He scored his first professional goal on 12 October, netting the winner in a 2–1 success over Fluminense also at the Beira-Rio.

During the 2015 campaign, Valdívia was one of Internacional's main assets, scoring five goals in the year's Copa Libertadores and another six in Gauchão. On 24 September, he further extended his contract for six more months.

On 24 May 2017, Atlético Mineiro announced the signing of Valdívia on a one-year loan deal.

In April 2019, he joined Vasco da Gama on loan until the end of the season.

Personal life
Valdívia's older brothers, Adriano and Andrezinho are also footballers. The former is a right back, while the latter is a forward.

Career statistics

Honours
Internacional
Campeonato Gaúcho: 2014, 2015
Recopa Gaúcha: 2016, 2017

Avaí
Campeonato Catarinense: 2021

Cuiabá
Campeonato Mato-Grossense: 2022

References

External links
Internacional profile 

1994 births
Living people
Sportspeople from Mato Grosso
Brazilian footballers
Brazilian expatriate footballers
Expatriate footballers in Saudi Arabia
Association football midfielders
Campeonato Brasileiro Série A players
Campeonato Brasileiro Série B players
Saudi Professional League players
Sport Club Internacional players
Clube Atlético Mineiro players
São Paulo FC players
Ittihad FC players
CR Vasco da Gama players
Avaí FC players
Cuiabá Esporte Clube players